Robert Randolph and the Family Band is an American gospel band led by pedal steel guitarist Robert Randolph (Robert Jermaine Randolph, born August 8, 1977, Irvington, New Jersey).   NPR has described the band as one with an "irresistible rock 'n' roll swagger". Rolling Stone included Randolph upon their list of the 100 greatest guitarists of all time. The band has released six studio albums and has been Grammy nominated four times.

Band history
Frontman Robert Randolph was trained as a pedal steel guitarist in the House of God Church and makes prominent use of the instrument in the band's music. The instrument is referred to in many African-American Pentecostal churches as "sacred steel". Randolph was discovered while playing at a sacred steel convention in Florida.

The group's sound is inspired by legendary funk bands such as Earth, Wind & Fire and Sly & the Family Stone. Randolph himself has explained that in his adolescent years before being discovered by the secular community, he was almost completely unaware of non-religious music. He went on exclaim in an interview that "I grew up and saw a lot of older guys playing lap steels and pedal-steel guitars in my church. I had never heard of the Allman Brothers, or even Buddy Guy or Muddy Waters."

Before releasing albums with The Family Band, Randolph was selected by avant-garde jazz organist John Medeski to join him and the North Mississippi Allstars on their 2001 jam project, The Word. Just prior to the release of The Word's debut album, Randolph was brought to the attention of music fans through a review by Neil Strauss in The New York Times in April 2001. On their first non-church tour of the East Coast, Randolph's new Family Band opened for the North Mississippi Allstars and then rejoined the musicians after their set, with Medeski, as The Word.

The first Robert Randolph and the Family Band album, Live at the Wetlands, was released in 2002 on Family Band Records, recorded live on August 23, 2001, just prior to the club's closing. The band released their studio debut, Unclassified on August 5, 2003. They attracted the attention of Eric Clapton, and have subsequently toured as a supporting act with the English blues guitarist. Clapton later guested on their 2006 album Colorblind, playing on a cover of "Jesus Is Just Alright".

In 2002, they were hired by ABC to make the network's new NBA theme song. The song, "We Got Hoops", only appeared in three telecasts, though it was used throughout both the NBA and WNBA seasons during promotions for both leagues. In September 2003 Randolph was listed as No. 97 on Rolling Stone's 100 Greatest Guitarists of All Time list. Robert entered the list following Leigh Stephens and directly preceding Angus Young. In February 2004 Robert Randolph and the Family Band along with the band O.A.R. released a cover version of Led Zeppelin's "Fool in the Rain", which was made available for online purchase through iTunes. This version was played live with O.A.R. at their June 18, 2009 show at Charter One Pavilion in Chicago.

Their third album, Colorblind, was released October 10, 2006. The song "Ain't Nothing Wrong With That" was used in several commercials for NBC, and used in Katherine Jenkins and Mark Ballas' jive on Dancing with the Stars. In June 2008 the Discovery Channel used this same song in a popular promo entitled "It's All Good" for their summer lineup. The song "Thrill of It" was used throughout the 2007 college football season by ABC during their College Primetime games.

They worked with producer T-Bone Burnett on their fourth studio album We Walk This Road, released in 2010. They released the supposed first single from that album entitled "Get There" but this song did not appear on the album. The first official single from the album is "If I Had My Way." Randolph used his steel guitar with a wah-wah pedal

Their 2019 recording, Brighter Days, was chosen as a 'Favorite Blues Album' by AllMusic.

Live appearances

Randolph's concerts are known for their lively stage performances, with Randolph content to let the rest of the band play on while he dances. Dance is an integral part of the concerts. During "Shake Your Hips", women are encouraged to dance onstage.

Other noteworthy concert regulars involve the entire band trading instruments allowing each member to show off their musical proficiency. When he becomes completely enthralled by his music, Randolph will kick the chair away from his pedal steel guitar and dance while he plays. A microphone is occasionally passed around the front row of the audience, so they can sing during the song "I Need More Love". Audience members are also called up on stage to sing ("Purple Haze") or be a guest guitarist for one song.

The band made its first television appearance on Late Show with David Letterman on August 5, 2003, performing "I Need More Love".

In 2004, Robert Randolph and the Family Band was the opening act on the Eric Clapton tour. They are featured prominently in the Clapton's Crossroads Guitar Festival DVD (2004). The band also appears on Bonnaroo Music Festival DVDs. The length of the concerts can vary greatly depending on what songs are played (the band does not use a set list) and how long jams last. Concerts go over the allotted time if the band and the audience are having fun. Most concerts don't have an intermission; instead, band members will exit the stage leaving one or two members a chance to shine with solos. The one time the band does stop is so the band can relax, get hydrated, and plan the encore. On October 9, 2004, Robert Randolph and the Family Band appeared on the PBS television show Austin City Limits.

On January 24, 2007, they played in Dallas at Victory Plaza outside of the American Airlines Center as part of the 2007 NHL All Star game festivities. The band also played before the start of the 2007 NHL All-Star Game. The Family Band has opened for Dave Matthews Band for some shows on their 2002–09 tours. In 2005 Robert Randolph appeared on the Dave Matthews Band release Weekend on the Rocks. Robert Randolph has performed as a guest during the Dave Matthews Band set on songs such as "All Along the Watchtower", "Louisiana Bayou", "Stand Up", "Smooth Rider", "You Might Die Trying", and "Two Step", among others.

In 2007, Robert Randolph and the Family Band played at the inaugural South Padre International Music Festival. In 2008, they opened for Eric Clapton and were also one of four featured artists on the Music Builds Tour. Robert Randolph and the Family Band played in Oxford, Mississippi on April 25, 2009, as part of the 14th annual Double Decker Arts Festival. In 2009 Randolph also sat in on two live performances of Led Zeppelin's "Fool In The Rain" with the band O.A.R.

Also, on June 22, 2014, Robert Randolph and the Family Band played at the TD Toronto Jazz Fest, welcoming a new "cousin" Andrew Prince to the stage for two songs.

Robert Randolph and the Family Band played the 10th annual Rooster Walk Music and Arts Festival in May 2018.

On July 30th, 2022 Robert Randolph and the Family Band opened for Zac Brown Band outside the Soaring Eagle Casino in Mt. Pleasant, Michigan.

Accolades

Grammy Awards

|-
| align="center" | 2003
| "Squeeze"
| Best Rock Instrumental Performance
| 
|-
| align="center" | 2003
| Unclassified
| Best Rock Gospel Album
| 
|-
| align="center" | 2017
| Got Soul
| Best Contemporary Blues Album 
| 
|-
| align="center" | 2020
| Brighter Days
| Best Contemporary Blues Album 
| 
|-

Discography

Studio albums

Live albums
 Live at the Wetlands (2002)
 Live in Concert (2011)

Guest appearances on albums
2001: "Garden of Love" and "Opportunity" – Demolition String Band on Pulling Up Atlantis
2002: "Cissy Strut", "Ruler of My Heart" and "Tell It Like It Is" – Dirty Dozen Brass Band on Medicated Magic
2004: "Mas Y Mas" – Los Lobos on Live at the Fillmore (DVD version)
2004: "The Good Life" – Rachael Lampa on Rachael Lampa
2005: "Crosstown Traffic" – Soulive on Break Out
2005: "Exodus" and "Louisiana Bayou" – Dave Matthews Band on Complete Weekend on the Rocks
2005: "I Am an Illusion" – Rob Thomas on ...Something to Be
2005: "I Want to Take You Higher" – Sly & The Family Stone on Different Strokes by Different Folks
2005: "Lay Lady Lay" – Buddy Guy on Bring 'Em In
2005: "Mission Temple Fireworks Stand" – Sawyer Brown on Mission Temple Fireworks Stand
2005: "Oh My Lord" – Ringo Starr on Choose Love
2005: "Trinity" – Santana and Kirk Hammett of Metallica on All That I Am
2005: "21st Century Schizoid Man" – Ozzy Osbourne on Under Cover
2008: "Otherside" – Third Day on Revelation
2008: "Out in the Woods" and "That's My Home" – Buddy Guy on Skin Deep
2008: "Train's A Comin'" – JD & The Straight Shot on Right On Time
2010: "There's No Tomorrow" – Elton John & Leon Russell on The Union
2011: "Straight Down the Line" – Robbie Robertson on How to Become Clairvoyant
2015: "Oh My Lord" - Randy Bachman on Heavy Blues

Guest singles

Guest appearances on soundtracks
2002: NBA on ABC – "We Got Hoops"
2004: ATV Offroad Fury 3 – "Squeeze"
2006: NBA Live 07 – "Thrill of It"
2007: Grey's Anatomy – "Ain't Nothing Wrong with That"
2007: Stomp the Yard – "Ain't Nothing Wrong with That"

Other appearances
In 1999, Arhoolie Records released Sacred Steel – Live! including performances recorded live in two House of God churches in 1998 and 1999, one of which was Robert Randolph performing "Without God". In 2001, they released Train Don't Leave Me: The 1st Annual Sacred Steel Convention including performances recorded live March 31–April 1, 2000, one of which was Robert Randolph performing "I Feel Like Pressing My Way". In 2002, they released Recorded Live At The 2nd Sacred Steel Convention including performances recorded live March 30–31, 2001, one of which was Robert Randolph performing "You've Got To Move". In 2004, Robert Randolph and the Family Band covered "Purple Haze" for the album Power of Soul: A Tribute to Jimi Hendrix. In 2009, Robert Randolph, along with The Clark Sisters, released a version of the song "Higher Ground" on the compilation album Oh Happy Day: An All-Star Music Celebration.

Music videos

References

External links

 
 Robert Randolph and the Family Band collection at the Internet Archive's live music archive
 Interview: Robert Randolph December 28, 2006
 Interview with Robert Randolph Ace Weekly, October 17, 2010
 "Pedal power: Can Robert Randolph steel success?" The Hook No. 515, April 13, 2006

American funk musical groups
American soul musical groups
Funk rock musical groups
Jam bands
Jammy Award winners
Warner Records artists
Randolph, Robert
Provogue Records artists